USS S-14 (SS-119) was a second-group (S-3 or "Government") S-class submarine of the United States Navy.  Her keel was laid down on 7 December 1917 by the Lake Torpedo Boat Company in Bridgeport, Connecticut. She was launched on 22 October 1919 sponsored by Mrs. George T. Parker, and commissioned on 11 February 1921 with Lieutenant Commander Charles A. Lockwood, Jr., in command.

Attached to SubDiv 18, S-14 sailed from New London, Connecticut, on 31 May 1921 en route, via the Panama Canal, California, Hawaii, and Guam, to Cavite, Luzon, in the Philippine Islands. She arrived at Cavite on 1 December and commenced operations with the Asiatic Fleet.

In 1922, she sailed from Cavite on 11 October, visited Hong Kong from 14–28 October, and returned to Cavite on 1 November. Sailing from Manila on 15 May 1923, S-14 visited Shanghai, Chefoo, and Chinwangtao, before returning via Woosung and Amoy to Cavite on 11 September. In the summer of 1924, she again visited Chinese ports and returned on 23 September. She finally departed Cavite on 29 October, shifting operations to the U.S. West Coast. She reached Mare Island, California, on 30 December.

Remaining at Mare Island in 1925 and 1926, she operated along the West Coast through 1927. From February 1928 into 1935, S-14 served in the Panama Canal area, although she visited Baltimore, Maryland, from 15 May to 5 June 1933, and was in reserve at Coco Solo from 1 July to 27 November the same year. Departing Coco Solo on 25 January 1935, S-14 reported to the Philadelphia Naval Shipyard for inactivation and was decommissioned on 22 May.

S-14 was recommissioned on 10 December 1940. Following duty along the northeast coast and a visit to the Panama Canal Zone, she operated at Saint Thomas, United States Virgin Islands, from 31 October to 1 December 1941, and in the Panama Canal area later that month. Next, S-14 operated at St. Thomas from January into March 1942; in the Panama Canal area from April 1942 into August 1943; and out of New London from September 1943 into March 1945, with operations at Casco Bay, Maine.

S-14 departed New London on 27 April 1945 for Philadelphia, Pennsylvania, where she decommissioned on 18 May and was struck from the Naval Vessel Register. She was sold on 16 November 1945 to North American Smelting Corporation in Philadelphia, and scrapped.

References 

Ships built in Bridgeport, Connecticut
S-14
World War II submarines of the United States
1919 ships